The Damaizin & Pujos was a French automobile manufactured only in 1910.  The company built chassis with a patented constant-mesh gear change, and may also have been known as "Dux".

References

Defunct motor vehicle manufacturers of France